George Parker Bidder Jr. (August 18, 1836 – February 1, 1896) was a British barrister who represented many water companies against the London County Council. There is a memorial to him on Mitcham Common. His father was George Parker Bidder, a civil engineer and calculating prodigy. His wife was Anna McClean (1839–1910), a daughter of John Robinson McClean. Their son, also named George Parker Bidder, was a marine biologist.

References

External links

19th-century King's Counsel
Burials at Kensal Green Cemetery
1896 deaths
1836 births